Events from the year 1902 in Scotland.

Incumbents 

 Secretary for Scotland and Keeper of the Great Seal – Lord Balfour of Burleigh

Law officers 
 Lord Advocate – Andrew Murray
 Solicitor General for Scotland – Charles Dickson

Judiciary 
 Lord President of the Court of Session and Lord Justice General – Lord Blair Balfour
 Lord Justice Clerk – Lord Kingsburgh

Events 
 5 April – The original Ibrox disaster: a stand at Ibrox Stadium in Glasgow collapses during an England versus Scotland football match. 25 people die and 517 are injured.
 29 July – St Lawrence's Church opens.
 15 October – The North British Hotel in Edinburgh opens its doors for the first time.
 2 November – The first Scottish National Antarctic Expedition, organised and led by naturalist William Speirs Bruce, sets out from Troon in the Scotia.
 10 November – Percival Spencer and the Rev. J. M. Bacon make the first-ever hot air balloon flight from the Isle of Man, landing in Dumfriesshire.
 Pulteneytown merged into the burgh of Wick.

Births 
 16 January (in China) – Eric Liddell, athlete, international rugby union player and  missionary (died 1945 in a Japanese-run internment camp in China)
 26 March – Marion Cameron Gray, mathematician (died 1979)
 27 March – Kenneth Macpherson, cinematographer (died 1971 in Tuscany)
 24 July – Renée Houston, née Katherina Houston Gribbin, comedy actress (died 1980)
 19 August – Fyfe Robertson, television presenter (died 1987)
 28 October – Jenny Gilbertson, née Brown, documentary filmmaker (died 1990)

Deaths 
 20 February – David MacGibbon, architect (born 1831)
 29 June – John Stuart McCaig of Muckairn and Soroba, creator of McCaig's Tower, Oban (born 1823)
 16 July – Henry Dunning Macleod, economist (born 1821)
 28 August – George Douglas Brown, novelist (born 1869)
 29 September – William McGonagall, weaver, doggerel poet and tragedian (born 1825)

The arts
 First modern play in Scottish Gaelic staged, in Edinburgh.
 The Classical Association of Scotland founded

See also 
 Timeline of Scottish history
 1902 in the United Kingdom

References 

 
Scotland
Years of the 20th century in Scotland
1900s in Scotland